Lieutenant General Teodor Frunzeti (born September 4, 1955, Bucharest) was the chief of the Romanian Land Forces Staff from 3 November 2006 to 17 March 2009.

Education

"Nicolae Bălcescu"  Military Academy, Sibiu - 1977
National Defense University, Joint Section, Bucharest - 1987
Military Higher Education Instructors Course, Bucharest - 1991
Joint Postgraduate Course, Bucharest - 1993
NATO School, Germany - 1995
Microcomputer operation course, 1995
Advanced French Course, Canada - 1995
PhD in Military Art and Science - 1996
Advanced English Course, USA - 1997
US Army Command and General Staff College, USA - 1998
United Nations Senior management Seminar, New York City and Oslo - 2004
NATO Defense College, Rome - 2005
Senior Executive Seminar at the George C. Marshall Center for Security Studies, Germany - 2006
International Defense Transformation Course at Naval Postgraduate School, Monterey, California, USA - 2006
PhD in political sciences - 2006
Associate university professor and PhD coordinator at the National Defense University, Bucharest
Associate university professor at the "Lucian Blaga" University, Sibiu

He is author and co-author of 13 books related to military activity and also of 114 specialty articles.

Positions

1977–1980 - platoon leader at the 1st Mechanized Regiment
1980–1985 - instructor at the Patriotic Guards, Bucharest
1985–1987 - student-officer of the National Defense University, Bucharest
1987–1989 - chief of operations and deputy chief of staff at the 1st Mechanized Regiment
1989–1990 - chief of staff at the 452nd Engineer Battalion
1990 - staff officer at the Operations Division within the 1st Army Command
1990–1998 - lecturer and professor at the National Defense University
1998–2000 - university professor, pro-rector and deputy commander of the Land Forces Military Academy, Sibiu
2000–2002 - Chief of Defense Strategies Section at J5 Strategic Planning Directorate, General Staff
2002–2003 - 33rd Mechanized Brigade commander and 10th Territorial Corps deputy commander
2003–2004 - Chief of Training and Doctrine (and Army General Inspector) and Commander of the Land Forces Command
2004–2006 - Commander of the "Marshal Alexandru Averescu" 2nd Joint Operational Command
 since November 3, 2006 - Chief of the Land Forces Staff

Honours

National honours
  Romanian Royal Family: 52nd Knight of the Royal Decoration of the Cross of the Romanian Royal House
  Romanian Republic: Recipiennt of the Faithful Service Cross

Foreign honours
 : Officer of the Order of the Legion of Honour

Personal life
Teodor Frunzeti is married and has one child.

References

External links
  General Frunzeti's biography on the Romanian Land Forces website

|-

Romanian Land Forces generals
Naval Postgraduate School alumni
Military personnel from Bucharest
1955 births
Living people
United States Army Command and General Staff College alumni
Academic staff of Carol I National Defence University